Edgar Donald Reid Shearer (6 June 1909 – 9 July 1999) was an amateur sportsman who played both association football and cricket at international levels. Shearer became an OBE after World War II and a CBE in the 1970s.

Early life
Shearer was born in England in 1909, but spent most of his life in Ireland. After being an excellent sportsperson in his youth, he left school to work in a textile factory. He initially played rugby for the City of Derry Rugby Football Club before he took up football, after her was noticed for his kicking ability.

Football career
In 1929, Shearer joined Casuals before joining Corinthian a year later. In the early 1930s, he also played for Derry City. He played in the 1935–36 final of the FA Amateur Cup for Casuals, scoring one goal in the replay of the final, with Casuals winning their one and only cup. During his playing career for Corinthians and Casuals, he played in 50 matches, scoring 38 goals. In the 1936–37 season for Derry, Shearer scored 78 goals including three hat-tricks.

Shearer earned seven amateur international caps for England, and represented Great Britain at the 1936 Summer Olympics. He played in Great Britain's match against Poland, scoring a goal.

He was made several offers to turn professional, including from Arsenal, but he declined, before he retired from football in 1939.

Cricket career
In the 1929 cricket season in Ireland, Shearer scored 2,000 runs. Shearer played 13 first-class matches for Ireland between 1933 and 1952. In 1932, he became the first cricketer to score a century in the final of the North West Senior Cup, when he made 110 runs. A year later, he made his highest score in the competition, with 233 runs in a semi-final match.

During Australia's tour of England and Ireland in 1938, Shearer played in Ireland's match at College Park, Dublin in September of that year. In the second innings of the match, he scored 56 runs, with no other member of the Ireland team reaching double figures.

In 1948, Shearer founded the Leprechauns Cricket Club, and is the only cricketer to be an Honorary Life Member of the club. In 1951, he played for the Gentlemen of Ireland in a non first-class match were he became the first Irish batter to score a century at Lord's.

Later life
During World War II, Shearer he served in North Africa and was the commander of the garrison in Tobruk, Libya. In the 1946 New Year Honours, he was awarded with an OBE. He later became the managing director of a textile company in Belfast, before becoming a director of Sir Alfred McAlpine & Son. He was also the chair of the Northern Ireland Sports Council and the president of the Irish and Northern Cricket Unions. In 1974, he was appointed CBE.

He died in July 1999, at the age of 90, and his obituary was published in Wisden.

References

External links
 

1909 births
1999 deaths
English footballers
Casuals F.C. players
Corinthian F.C. players
Derry City F.C. players
England amateur international footballers
Footballers at the 1936 Summer Olympics
Olympic footballers of Great Britain
Irish cricketers
Marylebone Cricket Club cricketers
Association footballers not categorized by position